Natalia Revuelta Clews (December 26, 1925 – February 27, 2015) was a Cuban socialite, mistress of Fidel Castro, and mother of his daughter Alina Fernández. Both Revuelta and Castro were married to other people.

Early life 
She was active in the Cuban opposition movement following Fulgencio Batista's coup in 1952 and, after being introduced to him, donated money and actively aided Castro and his movement.

Following the birth of her daughter in 1956 and Castro's return from exile in Mexico, Revuelta supported the Cuban revolution but did not continue a relationship with him.

References

2015 deaths
Fidel Castro family
People from Havana
1925 births
Cuban communists
Female revolutionaries